The graceful snail-eater (Dipsas gracilis), is a non-venomous snake found in the northern part of South America (NW Ecuador, Peru, and Colombia).
No subspecies are currently recognized.

References

gracilis
Snakes of South America
Reptiles of Colombia
Reptiles of Ecuador
Reptiles of Peru
Reptiles described in 1902
Taxa named by George Albert Boulenger